Sheringham is a surname. Notable people with this surname include:

 Charlie Sheringham (born 1988), English footballer
 George Sheringham (1884–1937), British painter and theatre designer
 Jackson Sheringham (born 1988), Australian rules football player
 John Sheringham (1820–1904), English clergyman, Archdeacon of Gloucester
 Michael Sheringham (1948–2016), British professor of French literature
 Robert Sheringham (1602–1678), English linguist, scholar and royalist writer
 Teddy Sheringham (born 1966), English football manager and former player

English toponymic surnames